Lennard Adjetey Sowah (born 23 August 1992) is a German professional footballer who plays as a left-back for TuS Dassendorf. He has previously played for Portsmouth, Hamburger SV II, FC Vestsjælland, Heart of Midlothian and Cracovia.

Club career

Portsmouth
Sowah originally came to England after receiving interest from Arsenal. He left Arsenal and joined Portsmouth, where he forced himself onto the periphery of the first team under both Paul Hart and Avram Grant. He was rewarded with the squad number 46 and made his first appearance on the Portsmouth bench in the League Cup win against Carlisle United. He was also named on the bench in FA Cup games against Coventry City and Sunderland. Sowah made his Premier League debut in April 2010 against Blackburn Rovers, as a substitute for Richard Hughes. His next appearance came in a 0–0 draw against Wigan Athletic, in which he played the whole of the second half.

On 18 April 2010, playing against Aston Villa, Sowah became the first player born after the Premier League was formed to start a Premier League match. He was born eight days after the first Premier League matches were played.

Hamburger SV
On 6 July 2010, Sowah returned to his hometown and signed for Hamburger SV on a free transfer.

Millwall (loan)
Having not made a single senior appearance for Hamburger SV, he signed on loan for Championship side Millwall until the end of the season on 31 January 2012, his first return to English football since his release from Portsmouth. He failed to make an appearance for the club during his loan spell.

FC Vestsjælland
On 22 June 2014, Sowah signed a one-year contract with the Danish club FC Vestsjælland.

Return to Hamburger SV
On 29 July 2016, he returned to Hamburger SV signing a one-year contract with the reserves.

Scotland
Sowah moved to Scottish club Hamilton Academical in October 2016. He made his debut on 15 October 2016, in a 2–2 draw away to Partick Thistle. In December 2016 it was announced that Sowah would be offered a new contract by the club, however he left the club at the end of his contract on 3 January 2017.

Sowah then signed for another Scottish club, Heart of Midlothian, on a contract due to run until the end of the 2016–17 season. Sowah was released by Hearts at the end of his contract in June 2017.

Cracovia
On 20 June 2017 he signed a contract with Ekstraklasa side Cracovia.

Return to Hamilton
In June 2018, he signed again with Hamilton Academical. He left Hamilton in May 2019.

International career
Sowah was born to Ghanaian parents in Hamburg and as such, has both German and Ghanaian citizenship. He has represented Germany at under-16, under-18 level and under-19 level.
The Ghanaian FA also declared interest in having him represent their under-20 side.

Career statistics

References

1992 births
Living people
German footballers
Association football defenders
German sportspeople of Ghanaian descent
Footballers from Hamburg
German expatriate sportspeople in England
Expatriate footballers in England
Expatriate men's footballers in Denmark
Expatriate footballers in Scotland
Expatriate footballers in Poland
FC St. Pauli players
Portsmouth F.C. players
Arsenal F.C. players
Hamburger SV players
Millwall F.C. players
FC Vestsjælland players
Hamilton Academical F.C. players
Heart of Midlothian F.C. players
MKS Cracovia (football) players
TuS Dassendorf players
Regionalliga players
Premier League players
Danish Superliga players
Scottish Professional Football League players
Ekstraklasa players
Oberliga (football) players
Germany youth international footballers
German expatriate sportspeople in Scotland
German expatriate sportspeople in Poland
German expatriate sportspeople in Denmark